Aagraham is a 1993 Indian Telugu-language action drama film directed by K. S. Ravi, starring Rajasekhar and Amala Akkineni. Thotta Yadhu was the art director. Prabhu Deva and Raju Sundaram were the choreographers. The film was dubbed in Tamil as Evana Irundha Enakenna.

Cast
Rajasekhar
Amala Akkineni
Padhire Krishna Reddy
Ram Gopal
Ramesh
Veera Swamy
Gadiraaju Subbarao
Sundara Rama Krishna
Sridhar Reddy
Rajasekhar Reddy

Awards
The film won Nandi Award for Best National Integration Film - Shyam Prasad Reddy

References

1993 films
1990s Telugu-language films
Indian action drama films
Films scored by Raj–Koti
1990s action drama films
Films directed by K. S. Ravi
1993 drama films